The 2018–19 NBA season was the 73rd season of the National Basketball Association (NBA). The regular season began on October 16, 2018, and ended on April 10, 2019. The 2019 NBA All-Star Game was played on February 17, 2019, at Spectrum Center in Charlotte, North Carolina. The playoffs began on April 13, 2019 and ended on June 13 with the Toronto Raptors defeating the defending NBA champion Golden State Warriors in the 2019 NBA Finals, becoming NBA champions for the first time in franchise history and the first team in NBA history to win a championship without a single lottery pick on the roster. This season would mark the first time since 2010 in which LeBron James did not make a Finals appearance. This would also be the final season for Dirk Nowitzki, Tony Parker and Dwyane Wade. This was the last NBA season to play in a regular 82-game season from mid-October to mid-April until the 2021-22 NBA season.

Transactions

Retirement
 On May 10, 2018, Nick Collison announced his retirement from the NBA. Collison played all his 15 seasons with the Seattle SuperSonics/Oklahoma City Thunder franchise.
 On May 25, 2018, after playing 13 seasons in the NBA for seven teams, Mo Williams announced his retirement from the NBA to take the assistant head coaching job at Cal State Northridge.
 On July 17, 2018, after playing 9 seasons in the NBA for four teams, Roy Hibbert announced his retirement from the NBA.
 On August 27, 2018, Manu Ginóbili announced his retirement from the NBA. Ginóbili played all of his 16 NBA seasons with the San Antonio Spurs franchise, winning four championships.
 On August 30, 2018, after playing 15 seasons in the NBA for four teams, David West announced his retirement from the NBA.
 On September 6, 2018, Boris Diaw announced his retirement from basketball. Diaw spent 14 years in the NBA and was an NBA champion with the San Antonio Spurs in 2014.
 On September 16, 2018, Dwyane Wade announced his retirement from basketball after playing 16 seasons with the Miami Heat, Chicago Bulls, and the Cleveland Cavaliers. He won 3 NBA championships in 2006, 2012, and 2013.
 On October 13, 2018, after playing 17 seasons in the NBA for eight teams, Richard Jefferson announced his retirement from the NBA.
 On March 23, 2019, after playing 14 seasons in the NBA for five teams, Al Jefferson announced his retirement from the NBA after signing a contract to join Big3.
On March 26, 2019, after the Miami Heat retired his jersey, Chris Bosh announced his retirement from the NBA. Bosh played for two teams during his 13-year NBA career, and he had not played professionally since February 2016 due to recurring blood clots in his lungs and legs. Bosh won back-to-back NBA championships with the Heat in 2012 and 2013. 
On March 26, 2019, Kris Humphries announced his retirement from the NBA. Humphries played for eight teams during his 13-year NBA career, and he had not played professionally since the 2016–17 season with the Atlanta Hawks.

Free agency
Free agency negotiations began on July 1. Players began signing on July 6 after the July moratorium ended. LeBron James' 4 year, $154 million contract with the Los Angeles Lakers was the biggest free agency news of the offseason after James spent the last 4 seasons as his second stint with his hometown Cleveland Cavaliers which began in 2014.

Coaching changes

Off-season
 On April 12, 2018, the New York Knicks fired head coach Jeff Hornacek after the team missed the playoffs. In addition, associate head coach Kurt Rambis was fired.
 On April 12, 2018, the Orlando Magic fired head coach Frank Vogel after the team missed the playoffs.
 On April 13, 2018, the Charlotte Hornets fired head coach Steve Clifford after the team missed the playoffs.
 On April 25, 2018, the Atlanta Hawks and Mike Budenholzer had mutually agreed to part ways.
 On May 1, 2018, the Memphis Grizzlies announced that J. B. Bickerstaff would become the new permanent head coach of the team.
 On May 2, 2018, the Phoenix Suns hired Igor Kokoškov as head coach.
 On May 7, 2018, the New York Knicks hired David Fizdale as head coach.
 On May 7, 2018, the Detroit Pistons fired head coach Stan Van Gundy after the team missed the playoffs for the second consecutive season.
 On May 10, 2018, the Charlotte Hornets hired James Borrego as head coach.
 On May 11, 2018, the Toronto Raptors fired Dwane Casey after the team was swept by the Cleveland Cavaliers for the second consecutive time in the postseason.
 On May 11, 2018, the Atlanta Hawks hired Lloyd Pierce as head coach.
 On May 17, 2018, the Milwaukee Bucks hired Mike Budenholzer as head coach.
 On May 30, 2018, the Orlando Magic hired Steve Clifford as head coach.
 On June 11, 2018, the Detroit Pistons hired Dwane Casey as head coach.
 On June 14, 2018, the Toronto Raptors promoted assistant coach Nick Nurse as their head coach.

In-season
 On October 28, 2018, the Cleveland Cavaliers fired head coach Tyronn Lue after a 0–6 start to the season and named Larry Drew interim head coach. On November 5, Drew was named as Lue's permanent replacement.
 On December 3, 2018, the Chicago Bulls fired head coach Fred Hoiberg after a 5–19 start to the season and named Jim Boylen head coach.
 On January 6, 2019, the Minnesota Timberwolves fired head coach Tom Thibodeau and named assistant coach Ryan Saunders as interim head coach.

Preseason
The preseason began on September 28 and ended on October 12.

International games
The Toronto Raptors played two preseason games in Canada outside of their home arena: first against the Portland Trail Blazers at the Rogers Arena in Vancouver on September 29, and second with the Brooklyn Nets in Montreal at the Bell Centre on October 10.

The Dallas Mavericks and the Philadelphia 76ers played two preseason games in China, in Shanghai on October 5 and in Shenzhen on October 8.

Regular season
The regular season began on October 16, 2018, and ended on April 10, 2019. The entire schedule was released on August 10, 2018.

Eastern Conference

Western Conference

By conference

Notes
 z – Clinched home court advantage for the entire playoffs
 c – Clinched home court advantage for the conference playoffs
 y – Clinched division title
 x – Clinched playoff spot
 * – Division leader

International games
On June 20, 2018, the NBA announced that the Washington Wizards would play the New York Knicks at the O2 Arena in London, United Kingdom on January 17, 2019.

On August 7, 2018, the NBA announced that the Orlando Magic would play two games at Mexico City Arena in Mexico City. They played against the Chicago Bulls on December 13, 2018, and they played against the Utah Jazz on December 15, 2018.

Playoffs

The 2019 NBA playoffs began on April 13 and ended with the NBA Finals, which began on May 30 and ended on June 13.

Bracket

Statistics

Individual statistic leaders

Individual game highs

Team statistic leaders

Awards

Yearly awards

Awards was presented at the NBA Awards ceremony, which was held on June 24. Finalists for voted awards were announced during the playoffs and winners were presented at the award ceremony. The All-NBA Teams was announced in advance in order for teams to have all the necessary information to make off-season preparations.

All-NBA First Team:
 F Giannis Antetokounmpo, Milwaukee Bucks
 F Paul George, Oklahoma City Thunder
 C Nikola Jokić, Denver Nuggets
 G Stephen Curry, Golden State Warriors
 G James Harden, Houston Rockets

All-NBA Second Team:
 F Kevin Durant, Golden State Warriors
 F Kawhi Leonard, Toronto Raptors
 C Joel Embiid, Philadelphia 76ers
 G Damian Lillard, Portland Trail Blazers
 G Kyrie Irving, Boston Celtics

All-NBA Third Team:
 F LeBron James, Los Angeles Lakers
 F Blake Griffin, Detroit Pistons 
 C Rudy Gobert, Utah Jazz
 G Kemba Walker, Charlotte Hornets
 G Russell Westbrook, Oklahoma City Thunder

NBA All-Defensive First Team:
 F Giannis Antetokounmpo, Milwaukee Bucks
 F Paul George, Oklahoma City Thunder
 C Rudy Gobert, Utah Jazz
 G Eric Bledsoe, Milwaukee Bucks
 G Marcus Smart, Boston Celtics

NBA All-Defensive Second Team:
 F Draymond Green, Golden State Warriors
 F Kawhi Leonard, Toronto Raptors
 C Joel Embiid, Philadelphia 76ers
 G Klay Thompson, Golden State Warriors
 G Jrue Holiday, New Orleans Pelicans

NBA All-Rookie First Team:
 Deandre Ayton, Phoenix Suns
 Marvin Bagley III, Sacramento Kings
 Luka Dončić, Dallas Mavericks
 Jaren Jackson Jr., Memphis Grizzlies
 Trae Young, Atlanta Hawks

NBA All-Rookie Second Team:
 Shai Gilgeous-Alexander, Los Angeles Clippers
 Collin Sexton, Cleveland Cavaliers
 Landry Shamet, Los Angeles Clippers
 Mitchell Robinson, New York Knicks
 Kevin Huerter, Atlanta Hawks

Players of the Week
The following players were named the Eastern and Western Conference Players of the Week.

Players of the Month
The following players were named the Eastern and Western Conference Players of the Month.

Rookies of the Month
The following players were named the Eastern and Western Conference Rookies of the Month.

Coaches of the Month
The following coaches were named the Eastern and Western Conference Coaches of the Month.

Arenas
 The Atlanta Hawks' home arena formerly known as Philips Arena was renamed State Farm Arena on August 29, 2018, coinciding with a $192.5 million renovation to the arena.
 This was the Golden State Warriors' final season at Oracle Arena in Oakland, before moving to the new Chase Center in San Francisco. The Warriors played their final regular season game there on April 7, 2019, against the Los Angeles Clippers, the final playoff game at Oracle Arena was game 6 of the NBA Finals on June 13, 2019, in which the Warriors lost to the Toronto Raptors.
 This was the Milwaukee Bucks' first season at the new Fiserv Forum after playing at the Bradley Center from 1988 to 2018. The Bucks played their first game there on October 3, 2018, in a preseason game against the Chicago Bulls, the first regular season game there was played on October 19, 2018, against the Indiana Pacers.
 The Toronto Raptors' home arena formerly known as Air Canada Centre was renamed Scotiabank Arena on July 1, 2018.

Media
This was the third year of the current nine-year contracts with ABC, ESPN, TNT, and NBA TV.

Uniforms
 The NBA began allowing the players to wear any color of shoes they wish; previously, they were restricted to white, black, or the colors of their teams.
 The first "City Edition" uniforms for the 2018–19 season were unveiled on October 30, 2018, and they were first worn on November 9, 2018.
 A sixth jersey apparel called the "Earned Edition" was first worn on December 25, 2018. The jerseys were awarded to the teams that made the 2018 playoffs.
 On June 6, 2018, the Denver Nuggets unveiled their new logos and uniforms to enter the 2018–19 season.
 On July 25, 2018, the Charlotte Hornets unveiled their new "Classic Edition" uniform to commemorate their 30th anniversary.
 On July 31, 2018, the Los Angeles Lakers unveiled their new uniforms to enter the 2018–19 season.
 On August 2, 2018, the Memphis Grizzlies unveiled their new logos and uniforms to enter the 2018–19 season.
 On August 8, 2018, the Orlando Magic unveiled their first "Classic Edition" uniform to commemorate their 30th anniversary.
 On August 16, 2018, the Atlanta Hawks unveiled their new "Classic Edition" uniform to commemorate their 50th anniversary since moving from St. Louis to Atlanta.
 On August 30, 2018, the Minnesota Timberwolves unveiled their first "Classic Edition" uniform to commemorate their 30th anniversary.
 On September 20, 2018, the Utah Jazz unveiled their first "Classic Edition" uniform to commemorate their 40th anniversary.
 On October 10, 2018, the Golden State Warriors unveiled their new "Classic Edition" uniform.
 The Indiana Pacers unveiled their new "Classic Edition" uniform.
 On April 7, 2019, the Golden State Warriors unveiled a throwback uniform to commemorate their final regular season game at the Oracle Arena.

Uniform sponsorships
In April 2016, the NBA announced that teams would be permitted to sign a uniform sponsorship contract for the 2017–18 season. Prior and during the 2017–18 season, 21 teams signed a uniform sponsorship contract. Before and during the 2018–19 season, the remaining nine teams signed such contracts:
 Chicago Bulls – Zenni Optical
 Houston Rockets – ROKiT Phones
 Indiana Pacers – Motorola
 Memphis Grizzlies – FedEx
 Oklahoma City Thunder – Love's Travel Stops & Country Stores
 Phoenix Suns – PayPal
 Portland Trail Blazers – Performance Health
 San Antonio Spurs – Frost Bank
 Washington Wizards – GEICO

Notable occurrences
 On September 21, 2018, the NBA approved three rule changes affecting gameplay, starting with this season onward. These changes include shortening the game clock from the typical 24 seconds to 14 seconds during offensive rebounds, simplifying the clear path foul rule, and expanding the definition of a "hostile act" to invoke instant replays on certain events more easily.
 On October 29, 2018, Klay Thompson of the Golden State Warriors set three NBA records. He set the record for most three-pointers made in a game by making 14 (out of 24), surpassing the former record of 13 held by his teammate Stephen Curry. He also set the record for most three-pointers attempted in a game at 24, as well as tied Chandler Parsons' record of most three-pointers made in a half with 10.
 On November 21, 2018, Vince Carter of the Atlanta Hawks became the 22nd player in NBA history to record at least 25,000 points.
 On November 23, 2018, Brook Lopez of the Milwaukee Bucks set the record for most three-pointers attempted in a game without making one, with 12 attempts.
 On November 25, 2018, Jamal Crawford of the Phoenix Suns moved to 26th all-time in NBA regular-season games played, passing A. C. Green's total of 1,278 games in 16 seasons.
 On November 28, 2018, Vince Carter moved to seventh all-time in NBA regular season games played. He passed Kevin Willis, who played a total of 1,424 games in 21 seasons.
 On December 5, 2018, Russell Westbrook of the Oklahoma City Thunder passed Jason Kidd for third place on the all-time career triple-double list by notching his 108th with 21 points, 15 rebounds and 17 assists.
 On December 11, 2018, San Antonio Spurs coach Gregg Popovich passed Pat Riley for fourth place on the NBA all-time coaching wins list by recording his 1,211th win.
 On December 13, 2018, Dirk Nowitzki of the Dallas Mavericks made his season debut, marking his 21st season in the league. This gave him sole possession of the record for most seasons played with one team, surpassing Kobe Bryant's 20. He also tied Robert Parish, Kevin Willis, Kevin Garnett and fellow 1998 NBA draftee and former teammate Vince Carter for the record of most seasons played in the NBA.
 On December 15, 2018, Russell Westbrook passed Kobe Bryant and moved to 30th place on the NBA all-time assists list.
 On December 15, 2018, LeBron James and Lonzo Ball of the Los Angeles Lakers both recorded triple-doubles. It was the first time that teammates had recorded triple-doubles in the same game since 2007, when Jason Kidd and Vince Carter of the New Jersey Nets did so. The last time a Lakers duo recorded it was 1982 by Magic Johnson and Kareem Abdul-Jabbar.
 On December 18, 2018, Vince Carter passed Paul Pierce on the NBA career three-pointers list with 1,145 three-pointers made.
 On December 19, 2018, the Houston Rockets set the record for the most three-point field goals made in a game with 26, breaking the previous record of 25 set by the Cleveland Cavaliers on March 3, 2017.
 On December 29, 2018, Vince Carter became the oldest player in NBA history to score 20+ points at 41 years and 337 days old, as he scored 21 points for the Atlanta Hawks in a win against the Cleveland Cavaliers. He broke the old record held by Kareem Abdul-Jabbar at 41 years and 331 days old.
 On January 1, 2019, Jusuf Nurkić of the Portland Trail Blazers became the first player in NBA history to record a 20–20 on a five-on-five (20+ in any two statistical categories and at least 5 on the remaining three statistical categories). He recorded 24 points, 23 rebounds, 7 assists, 5 steals and 5 blocks in a 113–108 overtime win over the Sacramento Kings.
 On January 5, 2019, Stephen Curry of the Golden State Warriors passed Kyle Korver on the all-time three-point field goals made list and moved to fourth place. In the same game, the Golden State Warriors (21) and the Sacramento Kings (20) recorded the most three-point field goals made in a game by both teams combined at 41. They broke the record set by the Minnesota Timberwolves (19) and the Cleveland Cavaliers (21) on February 7, 2018.
 On January 10, 2019, coach Gregg Popovich of the San Antonio Spurs became the third coach with most wins in NBA history after posting a win in double overtime against the Oklahoma City Thunder, 154–147. He passed Jerry Sloan with his 1,222nd win.
 On January 11, 2019, Stephen Curry moved past Jason Terry for third place on the list of NBA all-time three-pointers made.
 On January 12, 2019, Kyle Korver of the Utah Jazz, passed Jason Terry to move to fourth place on the NBA all-time three-point field goals made list.
 On January 13, 2019, James Harden (1/17) of the Houston Rockets tied Damon Stoudamire's (5/21) NBA record for most three-point field goals missed in a game with 16.
 On January 16, 2019, the Golden State Warriors (24) and the New Orleans Pelicans (19) recorded the most three-point field goals made in a game by both teams combined at 43. They broke the record the Warriors (21) and the Sacramento Kings (20) just set 11 days prior with 41.
 On January 21, 2019, Klay Thompson tied the record for most consecutive three-point field goals made in a game at 10.
 On February 7, 2019, Vince Carter passed Jerry West for 21st on the NBA's all-time scoring list.
 On February 11, 2019, Russell Westbrook set an NBA record of recording ten straight games with a triple double which broke Wilt Chamberlain's old record of nine.
 On February 21, 2019, James Harden recorded his 32nd consecutive game of scoring 30+ points which makes it the second longest 30 or more points streak in NBA history. The streak started on December 23, 2018, and ended on February 25, 2019.
 On February 28, 2019, Chris Paul of the Houston Rockets moved to 10th place on the NBA's all-time steals leaders which was previously held by Karl Malone.
 On March 5, 2019, Vince Carter passed Reggie Miller for 20th place on the NBA's all-time scoring list, passed Jamal Crawford for sixth place on the NBAs all-time three point field goals made leaders, became the oldest player to shoot 7 three-pointers and broke his own record of being the oldest player to score 20+ points in a game at 42 years and 37 days old.
 On March 7, 2019, LeBron James moved past Michael Jordan for fourth place on the NBA's all-time scoring list.
 On March 8, 2019, Dirk Nowitzki moved to the third spot in the NBA all-time games played.
 On March 8, 2019, Lou Williams of the Los Angeles Clippers set an NBA record for scoring at least 30 points in a game as a reserve when he scored 40 points against the Oklahoma City Thunder. This marked the 28th time for Williams which surpassed Ricky Pierce's record at 27. He also moved to second place in career points off the bench and passed Jamal Crawford.
 On March 10, 2019, Chris Paul moved past Isiah Thomas for seventh place on the NBA's all-time assist leaders.
 On March 11, 2019, Lou Williams became the NBA's career leader in points off the bench (11,154) with 34 points in a 140–115 win over the Boston Celtics, surpassing Dell Curry (11,147).
 On March 18, 2019, Dirk Nowitzki passed Wilt Chamberlain for sixth place on the NBA's all-time scoring list.
 On March 19, 2019, James Harden became the first player in NBA history to score 30 or more points against all 29 other teams in a single season.
 On March 31, 2019, Vince Carter moved to top 5 in career NBA games played.
 On April 2, 2019, Russell Westbrook became the second player in history after Wilt Chamberlain to register a 20–20–20 game, scoring 20 points, 21 assists and 20 rebounds in a 119–103 win against the Los Angeles Lakers.

References

 
NBA
2018–19 in Canadian basketball